JWI or jwi may refer to:

 Jewish Women International, a Jewish-American social service organization
 jwi, the ISO 639-3 code for Jwira-Pepesa language, Ghana